Chemins de Terre is a folk rock album by Alan Stivell, originally released in 1973. It was produced by Franck Giboni. It was retitled From Celtic Roots... in the United Kingdom and Celtic Rock in Germany.

Track listing 
All tracks Traditional, arranged by Alan Stivell; except where indicated
"Susy MacGuire" 3:35 
"Ian Morrison Reel" 4:09 (Peter McLeod, arranged by Alan Stivell)  
"She Moved Through The Fair" 4:13  
"Can Y Melinydd" 1:59  
"Oidhche Mhaith" 1:53   
"An Dro Nevez" 3:45
"Maro e Ma Mestrez" 3:08   
"Brezhoneg' Raok" 3:08 (Alan Stivell)  
"An Hini a Garan" 4:11   
"Metig" 4:07 
"Kimiad" 3:34

Personnel 
Alan Stivell - Celtic harp, vocals, Scottish bagpipes, whistle, mellotron, timbales, harmonium
Gabriel Yacoub - acoustic guitar, banjo, dulcimer, psaltery, vocal
René Werneer - fiddle, vocals
Pascal Stive - organ, piano
Jean-Luc Hallereau - bass, vocal
Dan Ar Bras - electric and acoustic guitars, vocal
Michel Santangelli - drums
Marie Yacoub - spoons, vocals
Elyane Werneer, Mireille Werneer - vocals
Michel Delaporte - tablas
with
(Breton pipe band) Bagad Bleimor - bagpipes, bombardes, Scottish drums

References

Sources 
 Jonathyne Briggs, Sounds French: Globalization, Cultural Communities, and Pop Music in France, 1958-1980, Oxford University Press, 2015, Chapter 4 "Sounds Regional: The World in Breton Folk Music" 

1973 albums
Alan Stivell albums
Fontana Records albums
Vertigo Records albums